Malatipur is a village in the Chanchal II CD block in the Chanchal subdivision of Malda district in the state of West Bengal, India.

Geography

Location
Malatipur is located at

Area overview
The area shown in the adjacent map covers two physiographic regions – the Barind in the east and the tal in the west. The eastern part is comparatively high (up to 40 metres above mean sea level at places) and uneven. The soils of the eastern region are “hard salty clays of a reddish hue and the ground is baked hard as iron.” It lies to the east of the Mahananda River. The area lying to the west of the Mahananda River, the tal, is a flat low land and “is strewn with innumerable marshes, bils and oxbow lakes.” The tal area is prone to flooding by local rivers. The total area is overwhelmingly rural. There are two important historical/ archaeological sites in the area – Pandua and Jagjivanpur.

Note: The map alongside presents some of the notable locations in the area. All places marked in the map are linked in the larger full screen map.

Civic administration

CD block HQ
The headquarters of Chanchal II CD block is at Malatipur.

Demographics
According to the 2011 Census of India, Malatipur had a total population of 1,201, of which 611 (51%) were males and 590 (49%) were females. Population in the age range 0–6 years was 107. The total number of literate persons in Malatipur was 962 (87.93% of the population over 6 years).

Transport
Malatipur is on National Highway 31.

Healthcare
Malatipur Rural Hospital at Malatipur (with 30 beds) is the main medical facility in Chanchal II CD block. There are primary health centres at Chandrapara (with four beds) and Chorolmoni (Khempur PHC, ten beds).

References

Villages in Malda district